Exit to Eden is a 1994 American comedy thriller film directed by Garry Marshall and adapted to the screen by Deborah Amelon and Bob Brunner from Anne Rice's novel of the same name. The original music score was composed by Patrick Doyle.

Dana Delany stars as Lisa Emerson (named Lisa Kelly in the book) and Paul Mercurio plays Elliot Slater. Half of the film consists of a new comedic detective story line written by the director. Several new characters were also created, including Dan Aykroyd and Rosie O'Donnell as police officers pursuing diamond thieves to the Eden resort.

Plot
Elliot Slater is a young, attractive, Australian professional photographer living in Southern California. Having always been uncomfortable with his sexual proclivities, which tend toward the BDSM realm, he signs up for a dominatrix-themed vacation on a private tropical island known as "Eden" in the hopes of working through his discomfort.

Unbeknownst to him, before embarking on his journey of sexual discovery, he has unwittingly photographed an international jewel thief of whom no other photos exist. The jewel thief Omar and his criminal partner Nina are intent on recovering the film in order to retain Omar's anonymity.

They follow the photographer to the island resort run by the dominatrix, Mistress Lisa Emerson, posing as vacationers. Following a tip that Omar is on the island, undercover police officers Fred Lavery and Sheila Kingston also arrive, Sheila in the guise of a vacationer and Fred as a handyman. When a submissive asks Sheila what he can do to please her, she tells him to go paint her house.

Comedic antics ensue amid the activities of scantily clad guests and employees, acting out their dominant and submissive fantasies.

In the course of Elliot's experiences as Mistress Lisa's personal submissive, including a scene where she ties him up and fondles his naked body (especially, his bare buttocks, which she also spanks), the two begin to fall in love. The action comes to a climax on a quick trip to New Orleans, where Lisa reluctantly admits her feelings for Elliot, all the while tailed by Omar, who attempts to kill them.

Fred and Sheila save the day, sending Omar and Nina to jail, and receive commendations for solving the case. Elliot returns to Eden and proposes to Lisa, who says yes. Also, the submissive who spoke to Sheila makes good on her request: he has her house painted.

Cast

Production
The whips used and shown in detail were created by Janette Heartwood. This was the last film produced by Edward K. Milkis before his death in 1996.

Reception
The film garnered attention during its release because of the BDSM themes, full frontal female nudity (including Delany), and because of the high profiles of the director, cast members, and the author. Promotional materials for the film included photos of Delany in dominatrix attire.

It was generally panned by critics, who expressed disappointment and confusion about the combination of the original story and the comedic elements. The film maintains a 5% "rotten" rating at Rotten Tomatoes based on 19 reviews, with an average score of 3.2/10. Roger Ebert gave the film ½ star out of four possible stars.

The film was not a financial success either, opening with a gross for the weekend of $3 million and a total gross of $6.8 million, which led to the company recognising a loss.

One controversy occurred when it was initially banned by the Saskatchewan Film and Video Classification Board. Critics were puzzled by the banning, as Saskatchewan was the only jurisdiction known to have kept the film out of theaters. After a brief media flurry, the Board lifted the ban a week later.

Year-end worst-of lists 
 2nd – Janet Maslin, The New York Times
 3rd – Robert Denerstein, Rocky Mountain News
 4th – John Hurley, Staten Island Advance
 8th – Glenn Lovell, San Jose Mercury News
 Top 10 (listed alphabetically, not ranked) – Mike Mayo, The Roanoke Times
 Top 18 (alphabetically listed, not ranked) – Michael Mills, The Palm Beach Post
 Dishonorable mention – William Arnold, Seattle Post-Intelligencer

Awards and nominations
O'Donnell won the Razzie Award for Worst Supporting Actress for this film, Aykroyd earned nominations for Worst Supporting Actor, and both O'Donnell and Aykroyd were nominated as Worst Screen Couple. At the 1994 Stinkers Bad Movie Awards, O'Donnell was also nominated for Worst Actress.

Home media
The film was released on VHS tape (NTSC) in May 1995, on DVD (NTSC Region 1, 4:3 Full Frame) in April 2002 and on (PAL Region 2) in 2003 (German Version "Undercover Cop" with German and English language sound).

References

External links
 
 
 
 

1994 films
1990s sex comedy films
1990s comedy thriller films
American comedy thriller films
American satirical films
American sex comedy films
1990s English-language films
Films directed by Garry Marshall
BDSM in films
Films based on American novels
Golden Raspberry Award winning films
Films set on islands
Films shot in New Orleans
American independent films
American police detective films
Films scored by Patrick Doyle
Films based on works by Anne Rice
Savoy Pictures films
1994 comedy films
1994 independent films
Film controversies in Canada
Censored films
1990s American films